Gerd Honsik (10 October 1941 – 7 April 2018) was an Austrian writer and lyric poet, and a prominent neo-Nazi and Holocaust denier.

Life 
Honsik was born in Vienna, Austria. He was a functionary in the Austrian "Volksbewegung" ("People's Movement"), also known as "Volksbewegung gegen Überfremdung" ("People's Movement against Foreign Infiltration") and "Ausländer-Halt-Bewegung" ("No More Foreigners Movement"), as well as in Austria's far-right NDP party. He was the founder of a militia group, the Nationale Front, which according to its manifesto carried out activities to effect "the abolition of the system".

He also appeared under the pseudonym "Gerhon Endsik", an anagram of the syllables of his name extended by two letters, intended to allude to the (politically charged) German term Endsieg ("final victory").

Honsik was fined and sentenced to jail in several Austrian court cases due to his activities as a Holocaust denier. He evaded his most recent sentence by fleeing the country, and residing in Spain until 24 August 2007 when he was arrested in Málaga after a recent change in Spanish legislation. On 4 October 2007 Honsik was extradited to Austria to serve out an 18-month prison sentence stemming from a 1992 conviction for Holocaust denial. Spain had previously refused requests to extradite Honsik because Holocaust denial and neo-Nazi propaganda were not illegal in that country. Honsik was only extradited after two European-wide arrest warrants were issued at Austria's request.

While in Spain Honsik contributed to the magazine Halt ("Stop") at irregular intervals. The magazine publishes Holocaust-denying and anti-Semitic articles. Honsik also wrote a book, "Hitler Innocent?", in which he attempts to justify some Nazi-era crimes.

On 27 April 2009, Honsik was sentenced to five years in prison in Austria for propagating Holocaust denial, later reduced to four years. The prosecutor argued that Honsik is "one of the ideological leaders" of Europe's neo-Nazi movement and that his distribution of "hate magazines" at schools violated Austrian law. During the trial, Honsik called himself "a social democrat" and stated that he only "rejected the textbook wisdom that demonizes National Socialism" and he only denied the existence of the gas chambers used in concentration camps "wherever I had not verified the (facts) myself". At one point, Honsik began screaming and pounding his fists after the judge denied his requests to introduce evidence which the court had deemed irrelevant.

Honsik denied the charges and said he would appeal the verdict; the prosecutor stated that he also would appeal to seek a longer jail-term of up to 20 years. On 29 April 2009, he was sentenced to five years prison, later reduced to four years. On 8 September 2011, he was paroled due to his high age. He died 7 April 2018 at the age of 76 in Sopron, Hungary, where he had been living since 2017.

Notes

1941 births
2018 deaths
Austrian Holocaust deniers
People convicted of Holocaust denial
Austrian male poets
Writers from Vienna
People extradited from Spain
People extradited to Austria
Austrian neo-Nazis